will.i.am Music Group is a vanity label founded by music artist will.i.am of Black Eyed Peas. Popular artists that were signed to the label other than will.i.am or Black Eyed Peas include Fergie, Macy Gray, Cheryl, and Sérgio Mendes. Initially based with Interscope Records, it was moved to A&M Records in 2003 before being moved back to Interscope in 2007. The label is now distributed under Epic Records beginning in 2020.

Current artists 
Black Eyed Peas
will.i.am

Former artists 
Macy Gray
Fergie
Sérgio Mendes
LMFAO
Cheryl (US only)
Natalia Kills
2NE1 (US only)
Kelis
Paradiso Girls

Discography 

Unless noted, albums from 1998 to 2003 and 2007-2018 were distributed by Interscope Records, albums from 2003 to 2007 were distributed by A&M Records, and albums from 2020 onwards are distributed by Epic Records

Black Eyed Peas 

1998: Behind the Front
2000: Bridging the Gap
2003: Elephunk
2005: Monkey Business
2006: Renegotiations: The Remixes
2018: Masters of the Sun Vol. 1
2020: Translation
2022: Elevation

will.i.am 

2001: Lost Change (distributed by BBE Records)
2003: Must B 21 (self-distributed instead of with A&M)
2007: Songs About Girls
2013: willpower

Fergie 

2006: The Dutchess

Sérgio Mendes 

2006: Timeless (distributed by Concord Records)
2008: Encanto (distributed by Concord Records)

Macy Gray 

2007: Big (distributed by Geffen Records)

LMFAO 

2009: Party Rock (in conjunction with Cherrytree Records)
2011: Sorry for Party Rocking (in conjunction with Cherrytree Records)

Kelis 

2010: Flesh Tone

Natalia Kills 

2011: Perfectionist (in conjunction with Cherrytree Records and KonLive Distribution)
 2013: Trouble (in conjunction with Cherrytree Records)

Soundtracks 
2008: Madagascar: Escape 2 Africa with Hans Zimmer & will.i.am
2011: Rio with John Powell & Sérgio Mendes

References 

American record labels
Defunct record labels of the United States
Record labels established in 1998
Vanity record labels
Labels distributed by Universal Music Group
Contemporary R&B record labels
Hip hop record labels
Universal Music Group artists
Black Eyed Peas
Will.i.am